Isachne is a widespread genus of tropical and subtropical plants in the grass family, found in Asia, Africa, Australia, the Americas, and various oceanic islands. They may be known generally as bloodgrasses.

These are annual and perennial grasses. The stems are hollow, the leaves are often nerved, and the inflorescence may be an open or narrow panicle. The spikelets are rounded to spherical. Many species are aquatic. Isachne globosa is a weed of rice cultivation.

 Species

 formerly included
see Chascolytrum Coelachne Cyrtococcum Panicum Streptostachys

References

External links 
 Isachne. Integrated Taxonomic Information System.
 Isachne. Grassbase - The World Online Grass Flora.

Micrairoideae
Poaceae genera
Grasses of Africa
Grasses of Asia
Grasses of North America
Grasses of Oceania
Grasses of South America